Milène Guermont, born in 1981 in Normandy, France, is an artist and an inventor.

Her major artworks in public spaces are the monument INSTANTS for the 70th anniversary of the Second World War at Utah Beach, the tomb CAUSSE at Montparnasse Cemetery and the monumental sculpture PHARES, the first and only artwork in history to be born next to the Obelisk on Place de la Concorde in Paris.

Important steps in her creative activity are Polysensual Concrete and the Total Artwork.

Biography
Milène Guermont is an artist and an engineer.

Early life and education

Milène Guermont is born and grows up in the countryside of Normandy.

She studies at Lycée Robert de Mortain, one of the smaller high schools of France. She sets there A levels in sciences with a non-compulsory option in fine arts, even if it is not taught in her school. She obtains a 20/20 when presenting her artwork THE FISH OF HAPPINESS. She becomes the first female of her high school to enter the preparatory classes for scientists (Math Sup, Math Spé). She spends these two years of high level mathematics and physics at Lycée Malherbe in Caen, Normandy.

In 2001, besides the national competitions for the engineering schools, she participates in the one of architecture school ENSAIS without having attended the specific preparation year. After succeeding in the creative writing session, for the oral she is asked to comment on a picture of the FALLINGWATER without having ever heard about it or of Frank Lloyd Wright before. At the end, she is one of the majors of the national competition to this architecture school in Strasbourg.

Finally, she decides to enter to the generalist engineering school ENSIACET in Toulouse and starts art expression classes in parallel. In 2003, she is hired as guest scientist at the Engineering Building of Brown University, an Ivy League, in Providence, USA, to work on carbon nanotubes. In 2004, she enters the ENSMN in Nancy with classes of art at École des beaux-arts de Nancy in the framework of ARTEM. In its library, she becomes fascinated by the stair design by Roger Tallon shown in a book. After speaking with this designer, she decides to submit her candidacy to the ENSAD where Roger Tallon gives the first class of design in France.

Milène Guermont sat the competition of this art school, considered as one of the two best of France, and goes straight to the third year. She is at this time the only engineer in the school. Besides the compulsory classes, she spends at least one entire day per week to learn painting in the class of the first year. She also experiments with argentic photography, bone china and fashion.

Career
Milène Guermont has diplomas in both art and engineering.
To materialize her ideas, she has developed several innovations, some patented.

The artist creates "Polysensual Concrete" to make sculptures that interact (sound, light, vibration) when you touch them.
The first interactive concrete sculpture is untitled TIDE-MATRIX and looks like a table; it is shown at VIA in 2007. The second one is untitled MUR OCEANE, has the shape of a wall, and is laureate to the competition MATIERE GRISE and shown at Maison Object. The third one is entitled BARREL and looks like a barrel that emits sounds and light when you pet it; this artwork is a finalist in the international competition of sculptures organized by Noilly Prat and is shown at ART PARIS ARTFAIR at the Grand Palais.

Her first solo show is entitled CONCRETE LANDSCAPES and occurs in 2008 at the Town Hall of the 8th arrondissement of Paris. The same year she does FIRST STEP on a bridge designed by Rudy Ricciotti at Saint Guillem-le-Désert (France), she uses her patented technique of Colored Engraving, and she creates MON AMOUR for Art Basel Miami (USA) at Galerie Bertin Toublanc that consists of one thousand concrete blocks and 3 balls of her Polysensual Concrete.

In 2009, her work is shown at the New Art Center of New York City (USA) and at the Art Center of Salt Lake City (USA).

In 2011, she does her first sculpture integrated into architecture: M.D.R. for the school of Sainte Marie de Neuilly (France). To make this piece, Guermont used three techniques:  Craters Concrete, Colored Engraving on Concrete and Polysensual Concrete.

Her first solo show is entitled SENSITIVE MEMORIES and happens in 2012 at the National Archives of France, it is the first time that contemporary artworks invest different rooms of the Hotel de Soubise.

Milène Guermont continues her work on the tactility and experience of touch to bigger scales. She creates public artworks from a few grams to several tons that respond to their environments, like INSTANTS (installed since June 2014 on Utah Beach) in the Atlantic Wall; PHARES, imagined as a dialogue with the Luxor Obelisk (installed from October 2015 until April 2016 on Place de la Concorde, Paris); or A BEAT on the Eiffel Tower in February 2016.

In July 2016, her artwork CAUSSE, commissioned by an eminent scientist, is installed permanently in the preservation area of the Montparnasse Cemetery in Paris. This sculpture is made of high-performance concrete and light.

She collaborates with people from different fields. For example, the architect Claude Parent imagines with her THE PEARL OF LAOS; this "folie" (an architecture without obvious function) is shown at FONDATION CARTIER. The theatre director Jean Lambert-Wild conceives a play with some of her artworks like her Polysensual Concrete sculpture BARREL.

She has a solo show called LES CRISTAUX at the Mineralogy Museum Mines ParisTech in 2016, the first time that the museum accepts to open its space to show contemporary artwork in dialogue with the collection of minerals.

In 2017, Milène is selected to represent the French engineers at the World Federation of Engineering Organizations (WFEO), UNESCO's partner. Her sculpture made of Polysensual Concrete, MINI AGUA, is the artwork shown at the French Pavilion of the International Exhibition ASTANA 2017.

She receives in Brussels the artprize of NOVA XX, international competition of women artists who use hi-tech.

In 2018, she has solo shows at Trinity House, Westminster, Jérome Seydoux-Pathé Foundation, Town Hall of the 13th arrondissement of Paris, UNESCO. PYRAMIDION is exhibited on a boat next to Musée d'Orsay during NUIT BLANCHE Paris. It is the only sculpture at Lieu Secret for the festival Badass with Lou Doillon, Agnes Jaoui and Manon Garcia. PYRAMIDION interacts with the public and the WALKING MAN by Giacometti at UNESCO in particular for the First International Day of Light and La Nuit des Musées. Her pyramid belongs to the "2018, European Year of Cultural Heritage", The International Day of Women Days in Engineering,  the London Festival of Architecture, the Open Houses of the capital of the UK. Soprano Katerina Mina performs a capella into PYRAMIDION TWIN at Trinity House, London.

Milene is one of the three "Entrepreneurial Women of the Year" of Usine Nouvelle, one of the eight speakers on "Women's Achievements and Professional Attainments" at the international symposium MoMoWo in Turin and becomes Honorary Fellow of Queen Mary University in London.

In 2019, she belongs to the French Delegation - she is the youngest and also the only artist - of the Global Summit of Women that occurs in Basel and receives the PEACE HERO AWARD.

In 2020, she becomes an Eisenhower Fellow (she is the only French one and the only artist) in a worldwide competition that identifies 25 women leaders. She receives the Maria & Hap Wagner Award in legacy to the American engineer and philanthropist.

In 2020, 80 companies of French Excellency are federated to create a habitable total artwork in the neighborhood of New Athens in Paris. It questions the notion of immersive arts. This habitable sculpture requires a lot of research and development: Milène designs everything from the parquet to the chandelier. She revisits ancient handcraftsmanship and new technologies. She creates a concept of an alphabet made of “art-objects” than can be expanded beyond the walls of the site in Paris.

In 2021, her sculpture BALANCE, made of concrete and light, is installed at Père Lachaise Cemetery.

Representation / Jury
Milène Guermont represents FEMMES INGENIEURS (Women Engineers) and IESF at international institutions such as WFEO since 2017.

Milène is a member of numerous juries, like that for the diploma of l’Ecole spéciale d’architecture, the artistic competition “Art et Sciences” at the Sorbonne, Ecoles d’Art Américaines de Fontainebleau, LVMH and the World Architecture Festival.

Bibliography
(en)  ART & CULTURE(S) NUMERIQUE(S) : PANORAMA INTERNATIONAL by Anne-Cécile Worms and Dominique Roland. Text by Véronique Odé. Editions Centre des arts d'Enghien-les-Bains. 2012.
(fr) ART ET ANIMALITE - DOSSIERS SUR L'ART under direction of Hélène Singer. Text by Vincent Delaury. Editions Ligeia. With the support of PARIS MUSEES. 2013. (ISBN 9770989602007)
(en)  LE GRIS by Annie Mollard-Desfour with the preface by Philippe Claudel. Editions du CNRS. 2015.
(en)  CULTURE ET CREATIONS DANS LES METROPOLES-MONDE, under direction of Michel Lussault and Olivier Mongin with the help of Sylvain Allemand and Edith Heurgeon. Text by Anne-Marie Morice. Editions Hermann. 2016.
(en)  PHARES by Ehab Badawy, Jean-Paul Viguier, Alain Niderlinder, Milène Guermont. Editions PublishRoom – Texte Vivant. With the support of the CNF de l'UNESCO, the RMN and the Fondation Henri Cartier-Bresson, 2017.
(en) MOMOWO - WOMEN’S CREATIVITY SINCE THE MODERN MOVEMENT (1918-2018): TOWARD A NEW PERCEPTION AND RECEPTION, by Helena Seražin, Emilia Maria Garda and Caterina Franchini. SRC SAZU. Založba ZRC, France Stele Institute of Art History. 2018.

References

External links 
 Official website of Milène Guermont
 Official website of PHARES

1981 births
Living people
French women sculptors
21st-century French sculptors
21st-century French women artists
French women engineers
21st-century women engineers
20th-century French women